Serupane is a community council located in the Leribe District of Lesotho. Its population in 2006 was 11,328.

Villages
The community of Serupane includes the villages of Ha Botilo (Mahobong), Ha Joang (Mahobong), Ha Khojane, Ha Kurata (Likhotolieng), Ha Lesiamo, Ha Lobiane, Ha Mahala, Ha Makoatsela (Likhotolieng), Ha Mapeshoane (Mahobong), Ha Mokausi (Mahobong), Ha Moqhathinyane, Ha Moseli, Ha Mosito, Ha Ramajake (Likhotolieng), Ha Seeiso (Mahobong), Ha Setene, Ha Thekoane, Ha Tlelase (Somololo), Ha Tota (Mahobong), Litloeleng (Somololo), Majakaneng (Mahobong), Makhoaneng, Mapholaneng (Somololo), Mohope, Naleli and Somololo.

References

External links
 Google map of community villages

Populated places in Leribe District